Pareuthria fuscata is a species of sea snail, a marine gastropod mollusk in the family Cominellidae.

Description
The size of the shell varies between 25 mm and 45 mm.

The ovate, conical shell is smooth and reddish brown. The spire is composed of six whorls, whose length slightly exceeds that of the aperture. The whorls of the spire are convex, bent obliquely at the suture, and marked in that part by slightly projecting and distant longitudinal folds. The body whorl is partially free of these, and those perceptible there, are only slightly obvious on the upper half of the side of the aperture. The aperture is ovate and smooth. The lips are a whitish, clear fawn-color, but the depth of the cavity presents the same tint as the exterior. It is narrower towards the base, where it terminates by a shallow emargination, the edges of which are slightly curved towards the back. The outer lip is simple, sharp upon the edge and effuse. It has, towards its upper part, an oblique fold, which seems to widen the aperture and partially forms the obtuse angle. The columella is almost straight, shining, and of a livid color.

Distribution
This marine species occurs off the Falklands; in the Strait of Magellan; in Antarctic waters.

References

External links
 
 Bruguière J.G. (1789-1792). Encyclopédie méthodique ou par ordre de matières. Histoire naturelle des vers, volume 1. Paris: Pancoucke. Pp. i-xviii, 1-34
 hilippi, R. A. (1842-1850). Abbildungen und Beschreibungen neuer oder wenig gekannter Conchylien unter Mithülfe meherer deutscher Conchyliologen. Cassel, T. Fischer
 Crosse H. (1861). Description d'espèces nouvelles. Journal de Conchyliologie. 9(2): 171-176
 Reeve, L. A. (1846-1847). Monograph of the genus Buccinum. In: Conchologia Iconica, or, illustrations of the shells of molluscous animals, vol. 3, pl. 1-14 and unpaginated text. L. Reeve & Co., London.
 Philippi, (R.) A. (1845). Diagnosen einiger neuen Conchylien. Archiv für Naturgeschichte. 11: 50-71.
 Filhol H. (1880). Mollusques marins vivant sur les côtes de l'ile Campbell. Comptes Rendus Hebdomadaires des Séances de l'Académie des Sciences. 91: 1094–1095
 Pastorino G. (2016). Revision of the genera Pareuthria Strebel, 1905, Glypteuthria Strebel, 1905 and Meteuthria Thiele, 1912 (Gastropoda: Buccinulidae) with the description of three new genera and two new species from Southwestern Atlantic waters. Zootaxa. 4179(3): 301-344
 Di Luca, J. & Zelaya, D. G. (2019). Gastropods from the Burdwood Bank (southwestern Atlantic): an overview of species diversity. Zootaxa. 4544(1): 41-78

Cominellidae
Gastropods described in 1789
Taxa named by Jean Guillaume Bruguière